Jole Jongole is a 2018 Indian Bengali-language science fiction thriller film directed by Nitish Roy, who was the production designer  for the Hollywood horror film Crocodile 2: Death Swamp.

The film stars Mithun Chakraborty as a 'mad' scientist who wants to bring back prehistoric creatures, perished millions of years ago from the earth as he is trying to expand the brain of crocodiles. Jackie Shroff stars as the antagonist who wants to take control of dangerous crocodiles for his own park.

A few scenes of the film were shot in Prayag Film City in West Midnapore, and shooting was completed by early 2012, but got stuck in development hell and was finally released on 6 January 2018.

Plot

The film is based on the experiment done by a mad scientist (Mithun) who comes up with a lovable crocodile. Like the dolphins, this crocodile was implanted with intelligence. At this point, an NRI (Jackie) eyes this project as he wants to build his own Jurassic Park and wants to get control on this crocodile.

Cast 
 
Mithun Chakraborty
Jackie Shroff
Ashish Vidyarthi
Tinnu Anand
Dibyendu Bhattacharya
Dijana Dejanovic
Biswajit Chakraborty
Mumtaz Sorcar
Titas Bhowmick
Pamela Singh Bhutoria 
Sayantani Guhathakurta
Riju Biswas
Sayak
Rajdeep Gupta
Anindya Chatterjee
Dhruba Lal 
Mumaith Khan as item number ""

Soundtrack

Remake

The film will be remade in Hindi as Gehra Paani with a higher budget than the Bengali version. For the Hindi version, the cast and location will remain same except Mithun Chakraborty, who will be replaced by Bollywood actor Sanjay Dutt.

Critical reception

Release

References

External links

Jole Jongole Website

2018 films
Films scored by Jeet Ganguly
Films shot in West Bengal
Indian science fiction thriller films
Films about crocodilians
Bengali-language Indian films
2010s Bengali-language films